Víctor Lechuga (born 10 August 1966) is a Guatemalan former cyclist. He competed in two events at the 1988 Summer Olympics.

References

External links
 

1966 births
Living people
Guatemalan male cyclists
Olympic cyclists of Guatemala
Cyclists at the 1988 Summer Olympics
Place of birth missing (living people)